Since its origins, Easter has been a time of celebration and feasting and many traditional Easter games and customs developed, such as egg rolling, egg tapping, pace egging, cascarones or confetti eggs and egg decorating. Today Easter is commercially important, seeing wide sales of greeting cards and confectionery such as chocolate Easter eggs as well as other Easter food such as turkey. Even many non-Christians celebrate these features of the holiday while ignoring the religious aspects.

Games 
There are a large number of traditional Easter games and customs in the Christian world. Many of these games incorporate Easter eggs. Although adopted into the Christian tradition of Easter, these games are probably based in ancient fertility cults (this is a classic example of syncretism). Of these the most well known, widespread and popular until the modern times are the egg rolling, egg hunt, egg tapping, and egg dance. Their rules may vary in different cultures and localities. At the same time, there exist less known peculiar customs. Nowadays child entertainers and kindergartens invent various new Easter games, often adapting well-known games to Easter topics, such as word puzzles involving Easter-related words.

Egg games
The rules of egg rolling may vary significantly, with the basic idea being an egg race. The eggs are either rolled down a steep hill or pushed across a lawn with sticks.
Egg hunt is a kind of treasure hunt game: children have to collect as many hidden eggs as possible.
Egg tapping is a contest for the hardest egg: the contestants tap each other's eggs with egg tips and optionally with other parts: "butts" or sides.
Egg dance requires dancing among eggs while keeping them undamaged. In some traditions the egg dancer may be blindfolded.

Africa

Ethiopia and Eritrea 

Easter, known as Fasika (Ge'ez: ፋሲካ, sometimes transcribed as Fasica; from Greek Pascha), also called Tensae (Ge'ez: ትንሣኤ, "to rise") is celebrated among Ethiopian and Eritrean Christians.

In Ethiopia, the most prominent and longstanding religion has been the Ethiopian Orthodox Tewahedo Church (then including the Eritrean Orthodox Tewahedo Church) since the times of Frumentius. Ethiopian (Ethio-Eritrean, Eastern) Easter, or Fasika, however, takes place in all the Christian Churches throughout the country, whether it be Orthodox, Catholic, or Protestant, and follows the eastern method of calculating Easter (see Computus for details), thus tending to fall after Easter in the Western calendar (some years both fall on the same date). Fasika is a much more important festival than Christmas, since the Death and Resurrection of Jesus is more significant in Orthodox and Ethiopian Evangelical theology than his birth. Jesus' crucifixion which led to his death on a Friday, according to Orthodox thought was for the purpose of fulfilling the word of God, and led to the conquest of death and Jesus' resurrection from the tomb after three days, the third day being the Sunday when Ethiopian Easter is celebrated.

Fasika is a climactic celebration. Fasting becomes more intense over the 55-day period of Lent for Orthodox Christians, Catholics and optionally for some Protestant denominations, when no meat or animal products of any kind, including milk and butter, are eaten. Good Friday starts off by church going, and is a day of preparation for the breaking of this long fasting period.

The Orthodox Christians prostrate themselves in church, bowing down and rising up until they get tired. The main religious service takes place with the Paschal Vigil on Saturday night. It is a somber, sacred occasion with music and dancing until the early hours of the morning. At 3:00 a.m. everyone returns home to break their fast, and a chicken is slaughtered at midnight for the symbolic occasion. In the morning, after a rest, a sheep is slaughtered to start the feasting on Easter Sunday. While Catholics and Protestant denominations have special Easter Services/Masses bringing in people from various smaller community churches together  to participate in an Easter sermon and celebration.

In Ethiopian-Eritrean Orthodox Christianity or the Tewahedo faith, it is believed the near-sacrifice of Abraham's loved son Isaac (Genesis 22), which was a test of faith from God to Abraham, was interrupted by a voice of an angel from the heavens, and the sending of a Lamb for the sacrifice instead. This Old Testament story is said to be a prophetic foreshadowing of God sending his only beloved son for the world as a sacrifice and the fulfilling of Abraham's promise.

Easter in Ethiopia, Eritrea, and its diaspora communities, is a day when people celebrate; there is a release of enjoyment after the long build-up of suffering which has taken place, to represent Christ's fasting for forty days and forty nights. People often have food and for most Orthodox Christians locally brewed alcohol from fresh honey (tej, tella and katikalla), while to a certain extent Ethiopian-Eritrean Protestantism generally discourages heavy alcohol.

Ethiopians and Eritreans in the West especially those of the Catholic and Protestant denominations celebrate Easter on both the Eastern and Western days. While most Ethiopian-Eritrean Orthodox Christians in the West refrain from doing so because celebrating the Western Easter celebration would interfere with the Orthodox Eastern Fasting Season. In most cases the Catholic Western Fasting Season ends earlier than the Orthodox Eastern Fasting Season as can be seen in the difference between the when the Eastern and Western Churches celebrate Easter (Fasika).

Nigeria 
Since the arrival of Christianity in Nigeria with the missionaries that came to the country from the early 1800s, Easter has been observed among the Christian population.

Asia

Malaysia 
Despite Malaysia being a Muslim majority country, Easter is celebrated in the states of Sabah and Sarawak in East Malaysia as there is a significant Christian indigenous population in both states.

The Americas

Bermuda 
In the British Overseas Territory of Bermuda, historically famous for growing and exporting the Easter lily, the most notable feature of the Easter celebration is the flying of kites to symbolize Christ's ascent. Traditional Bermuda kites are constructed by Bermudians of all ages as Easter approaches, and are normally only flown at Easter. In addition to hot cross buns and Easter eggs, fish cakes are traditionally eaten in Bermuda at this time.

Jamaica 
In Jamaica, eating bun and cheese is a highly anticipated custom by Jamaican nationals all over the world. The Jamaica Easter Buns are spiced and have raisins, and baked in a loaf tin. The buns are sliced and eaten with a slice of cheese. It is a common practice for employers to make gifts of bun and cheese or a single loaf of bun to staff members. According to the Jamaica Gleaner, "The basic Easter bun recipe requires wheat flour, brown sugar, molasses, baking powder or yeast and dried fruits." Easter egg traditions and the Easter Bunny activities are not widespread in Jamaica. Also, Jamaican traditions include sometimes include throwing garlic onto the floor as a sign of good luck during Easter dinner.

United States 
In Louisiana, USA, egg tapping is known as egg-knocking. Marksville, Louisiana claims to host the oldest egg-knocking competition in the US, dating back to the 1950s. Competitors pair up on the steps of the courthouse on Easter Sunday and knock the tips of two eggs together. If a participant's egg shell cracks they have to forfeit it, a process that continues until just one egg remains. Venetia Newall describes egg eating competitions in Western Germany and among German emigrants to Pennsylvania, United States.

Europe

Central and Eastern Europe 

Many central and eastern European ethnic groups, including the Albanians, Armenians, Belarusians, Bulgarians, Croats, Czechs, Estonians, Georgians, Germans, Hungarians, Latvians, Lithuanians, Macedonians, Poles, Romanians, Russians, Serbs, Slovaks, Slovenes, and Ukrainians, decorate eggs for Easter.

In Bulgaria, the Easter eggs are decorated on Thursday or Saturday before Easter. Widespread tradition is to fight with eggs by pair, and the one whose egg is the last surviving is called borak (fighter). The tradition is to display the decorated eggs on the Easter table together with the Easter dinner consisting of roasted lamb, a salad called Easter salad  (lettuce with cucumbers),  and a sweet bread called kozunak.

In the Czech Republic, Slovakia, and some parts of Hungary, a tradition of spanking or whipping is carried out on Easter Monday. In the morning, men spank women with a special handmade whip called "Easter switches" called a pomlázka (in Czech) or korbáč  (in Slovak); in eastern regions of former Czechoslovakia Moravia and Slovakia they also pour cold water on them. The pomlázka/korbáč consists of eight, 12 or even 24 withies (willow rods), is usually from half a metre to two meters long and decorated with coloured ribbons at the end. In some regions it might be replaced by a stick of a juniper tree. The spanking may be painful, but it's not intended to cause suffering. A legend says that women should be spanked with a whip in order to keep their health, beauty, and fertility during the whole next year.

An additional purpose can be for men to exhibit their attraction to women; unvisited women can even feel offended. Traditionally, the spanked woman gives a coloured egg (kraslice) they've prepared by themselves as invitations to eat and drink and as a sign of her thanks to the man. If the visitor is a small boy, he is usually provided with sweets and a small amount of money.

In some regions, the women can get revenge in the afternoon or the following day when they can pour a bucket of cold water on any man. The habit slightly varies across Slovakia and the Czech Republic. A similar tradition existed in Poland (where it is called Dyngus Day), but it is now little more than an all-day water fight.

In Germany, decorated eggs are hung on branches of bushes and trees to make them Easter egg trees. Eggs are also used to dress wells for Easter, the Osterbrunnen, most prominently in the Fränkische Schweiz (Franconian Switzerland).

In Bosnia and Herzegovina, Croatia, and Slovenia, a basket of food is prepared, covered with a handmade cloth, and brought to the church to be blessed.  A typical Easter basket includes bread, colored eggs, ham, horseradish, and a type of nut cake called "potica".

In Bosnia and Herzegovina, Montenegro, Serbia and Kosovo, jumping over flames is a customary requirement to jump over fire.

Cyprus 
As well as the common painted easter egg hunt, in Cyprus it is customary for people to light great fires (Greek: λαμπρατζια) in schools or church yards. The fires are made up of scrap wood, gathered usually by enthusiastic young boys which scour their neighbourhoods for them, in order to make their fire as great as it can be (and bigger than the neighbouring one). More than often this competition leads to fights happening over scraps of wood and the police or fire department being called to put out the fires that have gone out of control. It is customary for a small doll representing Judas Iscariot to be burnt. The same thing happens on Crete, but it is non-competitive, and the fire is called "founara" which means "big fire" in Cretan Greek. The founara burns coupled with the detonation of small dynamites called "plakatzikia" in plural, and with gunshots in the air.

Germany 
In northern Germany, Easter Fires (in German: Osterfeuer) are lit around sunset on Holy Saturday. Each of the federal states have their own regulations for allowing and/or the way of staging Easter Fires: While in the city and state of Hamburg, private persons are allowed to have an Easter Fire of any size on their own premises, in Schleswig-Holstein, for example, only the widespread voluntary fire brigades are allowed to organize and stage them on open fields. Over the past years, Easter Fires themselves have become larger and developed to smaller versions of Volksfests with some snack stands selling Bratwurst, steak in bread rolls, beer, wine, and soft drinks as well as maybe one or two rides for the children. Usually, Easter Fires are kept burning over hours until dawn (roughly around 6 o'clock) and cause therefore a special atmosphere during the whole Easter Night with their bright lights in the dark and the omnipresent smell of smoke.

During the weeks before Easter, special Easter bread is sold (in German: Osterbrot). This is made with yeast dough, raisins, and almond splinters. Usually, it is cut in slices and spread with butter. People enjoy it either for breakfast or for tea time (in German: Kaffee und Kuchen, literally ″coffee and cake″).

In many parts of Germany a popular Easter pastime is egg throwing. In this "game" there are no winners or losers, nor any apparent aim. Participants throw a painted and decorated hard boiled egg as far as they can across the fields. This is repeated until eventually the egg bursts apart, an event that takes a sometimes surprising number of throws. In other versions it is a competitive event when pairs throw a raw egg to each other while moving further and further apart.

United Kingdom
In Scotland, the north of England, and Northern Ireland, the traditions of rolling decorated eggs down steep hills and pace egging are still adhered to.

Strutt and Hone in their 1867 book The Sports and Pastimes of the People of England describe an Easter tradition from the Isles of Scilly called goose dancing. For goose dancing the maidens dress up as young men and vice versa. In this disguise they visit neighbours for dancing and making joke stories.

Hungary 
In Hungary, Transylvania, Southern Slovakia, Kárpátalja, Northern Serbia - Vojvodina, and other territories with Hungarian-speaking communities, the day following Easter is called Locsoló Hétfő, "Watering Monday".  Men usually visit families with girls and women.  Water, perfume or perfumed water is  sprinkled  on the women and  girls of the house by the visiting  men, who  are given in exchange an Easter egg. Traditionally Easter ham, colored boiled eggs and horseradish sauce is consumed on Sunday morning. In the Eastern part of the country, an Easter specialty known as sárgatúró (literally "yellow curd cheese") is made for the occasion.

Ireland 
Easter was traditionally the most important date in the Christian calendar in Ireland, with a large feast marking the end of lent on Easter Sunday. Among the food commonly eaten were lamb, veal, and chicken, with a meal of corned beef, cabbage, and floury potatoes was a popular meal. It was traditional for farmers to share the meat from a slaughtered bullock or lamb with neighbours and or the less fortunate. Another tradition was that if a beggar called to a house, they would be given roasted potatoes. At this time of year, eggs were plentiful, and would be eaten at each meal.

Eggs were dyed for good luck, using a variety of methods such as boiling them with certain lichens and plants. The coloured eggshells would be kept to decorate the May bush. A tradition among children was to collect their own food for a feast, including eggs and potatoes, which they would cook outdoors using a fire. They would also eat buttered bread, sweet cakes, with milk of homemade cordial. The place the children's feast was held would be known as a clúdóg. As a game on Easter Sunday, it was a custom to roll hard boiled eggs down a hill. There are records of Easter Sunday being referred to as Easter Egg Day as far back as 1827, recounting the consumption of eggs.

Easter is a day of remembrance for the men and women who died in the Easter Rising which began on Easter Monday 1916. Until 1966, there was a parade of veterans, past the headquarters of the Irish Volunteers at the General Post Office (GPO) on O'Connell Street, Dublin, and a reading of the Proclamation of the Irish Republic. It is usually celebrated on Easter Monday.

Italy

In Florence, Italy, the unique custom of the Scoppio del carro is observed in which a holy fire lit from stone shards from the Holy Sepulchre are used to light a fire during the singing of the Gloria of the Easter Sunday Mass, which is used to ignite a rocket in the form of a dove, representing peace and the Holy Spirit, which following a wire in turn lights a cart containing pyrotechnics in the small square before the cathedral.

The Netherlands, Belgium and France 
Church bells are silent as a sign of mourning for one or more days before Easter in The Netherlands, Belgium and France.  This has led to an Easter tradition that says the bells fly out of their steeples to go to Rome (explaining their silence), and return on Easter morning bringing both colored eggs and hollow chocolate shaped like eggs or rabbits.

In both The Netherlands and Dutch-speaking Belgium many of more modern traditions exist alongside the Easter Bell story.  The bells ("de Paasklokken") leave for Rome on Holy Saturday, called "Stille Zaterdag" (literally "Silent Saturday") in Dutch. In the northern and eastern parts of the Netherlands (Twente and Achterhoek), Easter Fires (in Dutch: Paasvuur) are lit on Easter Day at sunset.

In French-speaking Belgium and France the same story of Easter Bells (« les cloches de Pâques ») bringing eggs from Rome is told, but church bells are silent beginning Maundy Thursday, the first day of the Paschal Triduum.

Nordic countries 
In Norway, in addition to staying at mountain cabins, cross-country skiing and painting eggs, a contemporary tradition is to read or watch murder mysteries at Easter. All the major television channels run crime and detective stories (such as Agatha Christie's Poirot), magazines print stories where the readers can try to figure out "Whodunnit", and new detective novels are scheduled for publishing before Easter. Even the milk cartons are altered for a couple of weeks. Each Easter a new short mystery story is printed on their sides. Stores and businesses close for five straight days at Easter, with the exception of grocery stores, which re-open for a single day on the Saturday before Easter Sunday.

In Sweden and Finland, traditions include egg painting and small children dressed as Easter witches (påskkärring or in Finland påskhäxa, typically dressed as old folks) collecting candy door-to-door, in exchange for decorated hand-made greetings such as cards or pussy willows, called virvonta in Finland, which is a result of the mixing of an old Orthodox tradition (blessing houses with willow branches) and the Swedish Easter witch tradition. Brightly coloured feathers and little decorations are also attached to birch branches in a vase. In Finland, it is common to plant ryegrass in a pot as a symbol of spring and new life. After the grass has grown, many people put chick decorations on it. Children busy themselves painting eggs and making paper bunnies.

Denmark has the gækkebrev tradition of sending relatives and friends artful paper cuttings, often with a snowdrop, and a rhyme with the letters of the sender's name replaced by dots. If the recipient guesses who sent it, the sender owes them a chocolate egg; and vice versa if they can't. The decorated letter custom was originally a means of proposal or courtship, but is now considered mostly for children. 

For lunch or dinner on Holy Saturday, families in Sweden and Denmark traditionally feast on a smörgåsbord of herring, salmon, potatoes, eggs, and other kinds of food. In Finland, it is common to eat roasted lamb with potatoes and other vegetables. In Finland, the Lutheran majority enjoys mämmi as another traditional Easter treat, while the Orthodox minority's traditions include eating pasha (also spelled paskha) instead.

In the western parts of Sweden and in Finnish Ostrobothnia, bonfires have at least since the 18th century been lit during Holy Saturday.  This tradition is claimed to have its origin in Holland.  During the last decades though, the bonfires have in many places been moved to Walpurgis Night, as this is the traditional date for bonfires in many other parts of the country.

Poland 

In Poland, white sausage and mazurek are typical Easter breakfast dishes.

The butter lamb (Baranek wielkanocny) is a traditional addition to the Easter meal for many Polish Catholics. Butter is shaped into a lamb either by hand or in a lamb-shaped mold.

Ukraine 
Preparations for Easter celebration in Ukraine begin weeks before the feast day, with Great Lent being part of it. The Ukrainian Easter eggs include pysanky, krashanky (edible, one-colour dyed eggs), driapanky (a design is scratched on the eggshell) etc. During the Easter Vigil a priest also blesses the parishioners' Easter baskets, which include Easter eggs, paska, butter, cheese, kovbasa, salt and a few other products. With this food, on their return home, people break their fast. The ritual is called 'rozhovyny'. People visit their relatives and neighbours exchanging Easter greetings. Celebration of Easter in Ukraine is filled with many other customs and rituals, most of which are centuries-old.

Oceania

New Zealand 
In New Zealand, the Auckland Easter Show is an annual tradition, also.

See also 
 Easter Bilby
 Easter egg
 Easter foods
 Egg decorating in Slavic culture
 Ēostre
 Paschal greeting

References